Bennett Airport  is a privately owned public-use airport located in Salisbury, Maryland, USA.

Facilities and aircraft
There are nine aircraft based at this airport, eight single-engine and one ultralight.

In 2014, the airport had 46,000 aircraft operations for an average of 41 per week.

References

External links
 

Airports in Maryland